"Sit on My Knee" is a song written by Dave Larkin, the lead singer of Dallas Crane. Dallas Crane recorded a version for their second album, Twenty Four Seven. (2000)

In 2005, Jimmy Barnes released a version with Dallas Crane as the second single from his eleventh studio album, Double Happiness. The song peaked at No. 14 on the ARIA Singles Chart.

Music video
The music video for "Sit on My Knee" contains Jimmy Barnes and Dallas Crane showing up at a Chinese pub and singing the song.

Track listing
CD single
 "Sit On My Knee" - 2:55
 "Edgewood"  (Jimmy Barnes)  - 2:58
 "Iodine"  (Dallas Crane)  - 2:45

Charts

References

2005 singles
Jimmy Barnes songs
2000 songs